The Magic of Christmas is a 1960 album by Nat King Cole, arranged and conducted by Ralph Carmichael.

This was Cole's only complete album of Christmas songs, although he had recorded several holiday singles earlier in his career. One of these, "The Christmas Song", originally recorded in 1946, was re-recorded for the 1961 album The Nat King Cole Story

It is the best-selling Christmas album released in the 1960s, and was certified by the RIAA for shipments of 6 million copies in the U.S. The 1963 version reached number 1 on Billboard Christmas Albums chart and remained for two weeks.

Track listing
Side One
 "Deck the Halls" (Traditional)
 "Adeste Fideles (O, Come All Ye Faithful)" (John Francis Wade)
 "God Rest Ye Merry, Gentlemen" (Traditional)
 "O Tannenbaum" (Traditional)
 "O, Little Town of Bethlehem" (Phillip Brooks, Lewis Redner)
 "I Saw Three Ships" (Traditional)
 "O Holy Night" (Adolphe Adam, John Sullivan Dwight)

Side Two
 "Hark, the Herald Angels Sing" (Felix Mendelssohn, Charles Wesley)
 "A Cradle in Bethlehem" (Alfred Bryan, Larry Stock)
 "Away in a Manger" (Traditional)
 "Joy to the World" (Lowell Mason, Isaac Watts)
 "The First Noel" (William B. Sandys)
 "Caroling, Caroling" (Alfred Burt, Wihla Hutson)
 "Silent Night" (Franz Gruber, Josef Mohr)

 All tracks, save for "A Cradle in Bethlehem" and "Caroling, Caroling", are credited on the LP label as being adapted by Nat King Cole and Edith Bergdahl.
 The album was reissued in 1963 as The Christmas Song, with the title track added as the leadoff to Side 1 and "God Rest Ye Merry, Gentlemen" omitted.
 An alternate, all-English performance of "O, Come All Ye Faithful" was recorded during the album sessions and first released in 1990 on the compilation album Cole, Christmas, & Kids.

Personnel
 Nat King Cole – lead vocals
 The Ralph Carmichael Chorus - background vocals
 Ralph Carmichael – arranger, conductor

Orchestra Members
 Piano: Milton Raskin
 Guitar: John Collins
 Bass played by: Lloyd Lunham
 Arco Bass: Bob Stone
 Drums: Lee Young
 Percussion: John Cyr (A3, A5, A7, B2, B6), Ralph Hansell (A1-A2, A4, B1, B4), Dale Anderson
 Harp: Kathryn Thompson
 Violins: Harold Dicterow (A3, A5, A7, B2, B6), Dave Frisina (A3, A5, A7, B2, B6), Nate Kaproff (A1-A2, A4, B1, B4), Joe Livoti (A1-A2, A4, B1, B4), Emanuel Moss (A1-A2, A4, B1, B4), Lou Raderman (A3, A5, A7, B2, B6), Isadore Roman (A1-A2, A4, B1, B4), Victor Arno, Emil Briano, James Getzoff, Alex Murray, Erno Neufield, Ralph Schaeffer, Joseph Stepansky, Jerry Vinci, Israel Baker
 Violas: Milt Thomas (A1-A2, A4, B1, B4), Alvin Dinkin (A3, A5, A7, B2, B6), Ray Menhennick (A1-A2, A4, B1, B4), Gary Nuttycombe (A3, A5, A7, B2, B6), Al Harshman, Lou Kievman
 Cellos: Dave Filerman (A3, A5, A7, B2, B6), Armand Kaproff (A1-A2, A4, B1, B4), Ed Lustgarten (A1-A2, A4, B1, B4), Emmett Sargeant, Joseph Saxon

On A1-A2, A4, B1, B4: 
 Trumpet: Ray Linn, Joe Triscari, George Werth
 Trombone: Jim Henderson, Tommy Shepard, Lloyd Ullate
 Reeds: Lloyd W. Hildebrand, Jules Jacob, Harry Klee, Arthur Smith

Charts

Weekly charts

Year-end charts

The Christmas Song reissue 

In 1999 The Magic of Christmas was reissued under the title The Christmas Song, with several added tracks including an alternate version of "The Christmas Song" with Cole's daughter, and with new cover art. This version of the album was placed at number 38 on Rolling Stones top 65 greatest Christmas albums of all time.

Certifications

References

External links
 Session details

Nat King Cole albums
1960 Christmas albums
Albums arranged by Ralph Carmichael
Albums conducted by Ralph Carmichael
Christmas albums by American artists
Capitol Records Christmas albums
Covers albums
Albums recorded at Capitol Studios